Regulating synaptic membrane exocytosis protein 2 is a protein that in humans is encoded by the RIMS2 gene.

Interactions
RIMS2 has been shown to interact with YWHAH, RAPGEF4, and UNC13A.

References

Further reading